Halil Pasha (fl. 1631–1633) was an Ottoman governor of Egypt.

Halil Pasha may also refer to:

 Çandarlı Kara Halil Hayreddin Pasha (fl. 1364–1387), Ottoman grand vizier (Çandarlı Halil Pasha the Elder)
 Imamzade Halil Pasha (fl. 1406–1413), Ottoman grand vizier
 Çandarlı Halil Pasha (died 1453), Ottoman grand vizier (Çandarlı Halil Pasha the Younger, his grandson)
 Damat Halil Pasha (died 1629), Ottoman grand vizier
 Köse Halil Pasha (died 1715), Ottoman governor of Egypt and Bosnia
 Kara Halil Pasha (died 1775), Ottoman governor of Egypt
 Ivazzade Halil Pasha (1724–1777), Ottoman grand vizier
 Halil Hamid Pasha (1736–1785), Ottoman grand vizier
 Halil Rifat Pasha (1820–1901), Ottoman grand vizier
 Halil Şerif Pasha (1831–1879), Ottoman diplomat and art collector
 Halil Pasha (painter) (1857–1939), Impressionist painter
 Halil Kut (1881–1957), Ottoman and Turkish military commander

See also
 Halil (name)
 Pasha